Brander may refer to:

Branding iron in human branding or livestock branding
Fire ship

Surname
Georg Friedrich Brander (1713–1783), German precision mechanic and mathematician
Gustavus Brander (1720–1787), English naturalist
James A. Brander, Canadian economist and academic
Jarrod Brander (born 1999), Australian rules football player

Given name
Brander Craighead (born 1990), Canadian football player
Brander Matthews (1852–1929), American writer and educator

Other
Brander Gardens, Edmonton, a residential neighborhood in Edmonton, Alberta, Canada
Brander Lake, Alberta, Canada
Battle of the Pass of Brander, a 1309 battle in the Wars of Scottish Independence